Elizabeth Page is an American writer, director and filmmaker.  She has written and directed for the stage, film and television.

Theatre
Spare Parts
 Produced by Pam Kantor and Olympia Dukakis at Whole Theatre (1989)
 Produced by Pam Kantor at Circle in the Square Downtown (1990)
 Nominated for a John Gassner Award by the Outer Critics Circle
 Published by Sam French http://www.samuelfrench.com/p/4764/spare-parts
The Nazi Plays 
 Denver Theatre Centre's US West Theatrefest (1993)
 Published Part I as Aryan Birth by "Best Short American Plays" https://www.amazon.com/Best-American-Short-Plays-1992-1993/dp/155783167X

Film
The Pilgrim https://www.youtube.com/watch?v=o-rmiTL2yc8
 Awarded "Best Short" - REEL13 on WNET
 Awarded "Excellence in Screenwriting" - The 29th Annual Invitational Film Show at the New School
 Awarded "Best Director" - the Staten Island Film Festival
Caught
 Awarded "Best Short" - the Connecticut Film Festival

Television
Direction
 Commercial for the touring production of the Broadway musical "BKLYN" with Melba Moore and Diana De Garmo (2006)
 Commercial for the theatrical production of "Sweet Songs of the Soul" starring Melba Moore (2008)

Writing

All My Children
 Co- Head Writer: (with Agnes Nixon & Jean Passanante; June 1999 - November 1999
 Script Editor: 1998 - 1999
 Script Writer: 1984 - 1990; 1998

Another World
 Co-Head Writer (with Tom King and Craig Carlson): February 1997 - March 1997
 Breakdown Writer: 1993 - February 1997

As the World Turns (hired by Hogan Sheffer)
 Script Writer: 2001 - July 17, 2007

General Hospital (hired by Ron Carlivati)
 Script Writer: March 12, 2012 – March 4, 2015

One Life to Live
 Script Writer: August 31, 2007 - February 15, 2008, May 2, 2008 – January 13, 2012
 Temporary Script Editor: October 13–19, 2009

The Catlins
Script Writer (1982–1984)

Awards

Daytime Emmy Award
Nomination, 2003 & 2006, Best Writing, As the World Turns
Win, 2001, 2002, 2004, 2005, Best Writing, As the World Turns
Nomination, 1994 & 1996, Best Writing, Another World
Nomination, 1985, 1988, 1990, 1999, Best Writing, All My Children
Win, 1985 & 1988, Best Writing, All My Children

Writers Guild of America Award
Win, 2006, Best Writing, As the World Turns
Nomination, 2005, Best Writing, As the World Turns
Nomination, 1999, Best Writing, All My Children
Win, 1998, Best Writing, All My Children
Nomination, 1997, Best Writing, Another World
Nomination, 1995, Best Writing, Another World
Nomination, 1994, Best Writing, Another World
Nomination, 1993, Best Writing, Another World
Nomination, 1990, Best Writing, All My Children
Nomination, 1989, Best Writing, All My Children

Writing History

|-

References

External links

Living people
American soap opera writers
American women television writers
Writers Guild of America Award winners
Year of birth missing (living people)
Women soap opera writers
21st-century American women writers